Rıza Tevfik Bey (Rıza Tevfik Bölükbaşı after the Turkish Surname Law of 1934; 1869 – 31 December 1949) was an Ottoman and later Turkish philosopher, poet, politician of liberal signature and a community leader (for some members among the Bektashi community) of the late-19th-century and early-20th-century. A polyglot, he is most remembered in Turkey for being one of the four Ottoman signatories of the disastrous Treaty of Sèvres, for which reason he was included in 1923 among the 150  of Turkey, and he spent 20 years in exile until he was given amnesty by Turkey in 1943.

Early life and career

He had a brother Besim, who would later commit suicide in Edirne. Placed in a Jewish school in Constantinople by his father, who was a prefect, Rıza Tevfik learned Spanish and French at an early age. He was remarked as a restless personality during his student years, first in the famed Galatasaray High School, and then in the Imperial School of Medicine, and he was arrested and incarcerated several times, not falling short of inciting fellow inmates to revolt during his prison months. He could graduate at the age thirty and became a doctor. In 1907, he joined the Committee of Union and Progress (CUP), and was one of that party's deputies for Edirne in the Chamber of Deputies (the popularly elected lower house of the re-established Ottoman Parliament) of 1908. He split with the CUP in 1911, joining for a short while the newly founded opposition Freedom and Accord Party (Liberal Entente), and was vehemently opposed to its entry of the Ottoman Empire into World War I.

Political career in the Ottoman Empire

Rıza Tevfik was named the Minister of Education of the Ottoman Empire in several cabinets (11 November 1918 – 12 January 1919) formed after the fall of the CUP and the Ottoman Empire's defeat in World War I. He was also appointed to the Senate (the upper house of the Ottoman Parliament) by the sultan, of which he became President twice (24 May – 18 June 1919 and 31 July – 21 October 1920).

He was one of the four signatories of the stillborn Treaty of Sèvres, being included in the delegation to the Paris Peace Conference by the grand vizier Damat Ferid Pasha, although he occupied no official position at the time of the negotiations, simply being a professor in Istanbul University. Since he was one of the signatories of the abortive treaty, he was included in the 150 persona non grata of Turkey after the Turkish victory in the Turkish War of Independence, and he had to leave Turkey in late 1922.

Exile, return to Turkey, and death
Rıza Tevfik lived in the United States, Cyprus, Hejaz, Jordan (where he was made the director of the National Museum and Library in 1925), and Lebanon during the following 20 years, until he could return to Turkey in the frame of a 1943 amnesty. He adopted the last name Bölükbaşı after the 1934 Surname Law. In the meantime, he had had his collection of poetry published in Nicosia.

He resumed work as a university professor in Istanbul until his death on 31 December 1949. Aside from his poetry and his articles on philosophy, he is also notable for his translations into Turkish for most of the poems of Omar Khayyam.

References

Notes

Sources
 Feylesof Riza (S.T. Wasti) Middle Eastern Studies, April 2002

Ministers of National Education of Turkey
20th-century writers from the Ottoman Empire
Turkish writers
Philosophers from the Ottoman Empire
Turkish philosophers
Male poets from the Ottoman Empire
Turkish male poets
Politicians of the Ottoman Empire
Academic staff of Istanbul University
1869 births
1949 deaths
People from Svilengrad
Galatasaray High School alumni
Burials at Zincirlikuyu Cemetery
Turkish people of Albanian descent
Turkish people of Circassian descent
19th-century writers from the Ottoman Empire